Edgar Roquette-Pinto (September 25, 1884 – October 18, 1954) was a Brazilian writer, ethnologist, anthropologist and physician. He was a member of the Academia Brasileira de Letras and is regarded as the father of radio broadcasting in Brazil.

Life 
Roquette-Pinto was born in Rio de Janeiro in 1884. He graduated in medicine at the Faculdade de Medicina do Rio de Janeiro in 1905. Roquette-Pinto became assistant of Anthropology at the National Museum in Rio de Janeiro (1906).

In 1912 Roquette-Pinto went on an expedition to Rondônia and lived for some time with the Nambikwara people, which until then were virtually uncontacted. He collected extensive ethnographic material and published them in the book Rondonia (1916), which became a classic of anthropological literature of Brazil.

In 1926 he became director of the National Museum and began building the largest collection of scientific documentaries in Brazil.

First radio broadcast in Brazil 

On September 7, 1922, for the Independence Centenary International Exposition, American technicians from Westinghouse installed a radio antenna atop the Corcovado mountain, to present the technology to Brazil. The first transmission  in Brazil was a speech of president Epitácio Pessoa. Roquette-Pinto, envisioning the radio potential for educational uses, convinced the Brazilian Academy of Sciences to purchase the equipment. Still in 1922 the first radio station in Brazil was founded, the Rádio Sociedade do Rio de Janeiro. Roquette-Pinto became its first director.

In 1936, Roquette-Pinto donated the station to the Brazilian government; Radio Sociedade became Rádio MES, then Rádio MEC.

See also 

 Troféu Roquette Pinto

References

External links 
Profile on Academia Brasileira de Letras website (in Portuguese)

Brazilian male writers
Brazilian medical writers
Brazilian anthropologists
Radio in Brazil
1884 births
1954 deaths
Writers from Rio de Janeiro (city)
Brazilian Academy of Letters
National Museum of Brazil
20th-century anthropologists
Officers of the Order of the White Lion